RTÉ Chill is a digital radio station of the Irish public-service broadcaster Raidió Teilifís Éireann (RTÉ). It broadcasts mostly chillout and ambient music as well as other low-tempo genres and typically features the output of such cutting-edge artists as Leftfield, The Orb, Sigur Rós, and Juana Molina.

It started broadcasting in March 2008, but had an official launch alongside its sister services on 1 December 2008. The station, which timeshares with RTÉjr Radio is on air between 21:00 and 7:00, and is available on channel 207 on Saorview, Ireland's free-to-air Digital Terrestrial Television service.

On 6 November 2019, RTÉ management announced that, as part of a major cost-saving program, all its digital radio stations would be closed, including RTÉ Chill. In March 2021, it was announced that the station would remain on air via Saorview, cable and online streaming, but the DAB network would close at the end of the month.

External links
 RTÉ Chill — Official website

References

Electronica/Chill radio stations
Radio stations established in 2008
Chill